Zdravko "Ćiro" Kovačić (6 July 1925 – 1 April 2015) was a Croatian water polo player who competed for Yugoslavia in the 1948 Summer Olympics, in the 1952 Summer Olympics, and in the 1956 Summer Olympics.

Kovačič was born in Šibenik in 1925 (at the time Kingdom of Serbs, Croats and Slovenes), but moved to Sušak the next year and therefore considered himself a native of Rijeka.

Kovačić was part of the Yugoslav team which was eliminated in the second round of the 1948 Olympic tournament. He played one match as goalkeeper.

Four years later he won the silver medal with the Yugoslav team in the 1952 tournament. He played all nine matches as goalkeeper.

In 1956 he was a member of the Yugoslav team which won the silver medal in the Olympic competition again. He played all seven matches as goalkeeper. He was given the honour to carry the national flag of Yugoslavia at the opening ceremony of the 1956 Summer Olympics, becoming the ninth water polo player to be a flag bearer at the opening and closing ceremonies of the Olympics.

He died in Rijeka.

See also
 Yugoslavia men's Olympic water polo team records and statistics
 List of Olympic medalists in water polo (men)
 List of men's Olympic water polo tournament goalkeepers
 List of flag bearers for Yugoslavia at the Olympics
 List of members of the International Swimming Hall of Fame

References

External links
 
 
 
 

1925 births
2015 deaths
Sportspeople from Rijeka
Croatian male water polo players
Yugoslav male water polo players
Water polo goalkeepers
Olympic water polo players of Yugoslavia
Water polo players at the 1948 Summer Olympics
Water polo players at the 1952 Summer Olympics
Water polo players at the 1956 Summer Olympics
Olympic silver medalists for Yugoslavia
Olympic medalists in water polo
Medalists at the 1956 Summer Olympics
Medalists at the 1952 Summer Olympics